The Play-offs of the 1999 Fed Cup Asia/Oceania Zone Group II were the final stages of the Group II Zonal Competition involving teams from Asia and Oceania. Those that qualified for this stage placed first and second in their respective pools.

The four teams were then paired up the team from a different placing of the other group for a play-off tie, with the winners being promoted to Group I in 2000.

Singapore vs. Pakistan

  advanced to Group I in 2000, where they placed last in their pool of six and was thus relegated back down to Group II for 2001.

Tajikistan vs. Kazakhstan

  advanced to Group I in 2000, where they placed fourth in their pool of five.

See also
Fed Cup structure

References

External links
 Fed Cup website

1999 Fed Cup Asia/Oceania Zone